The  1971 Monte Carlo Open – Men's doubles was an event of the  1971 Monte Carlo Open tennis tournament. Marty Riessen and Roger Taylor were the defending champions but did not compete together in this edition. First-seeded team of Ilie Năstase and Ion Țiriac won the doubles title by defeating the first-seeded pairing of Tom Okker and Roger Taylor in the final 1–6, 6–3, 6–3, 8–6.

Seeds

Draw

References

External links
 ATP tournament profile
 ITF tournament edition details

Monte Carlo Doubles